Vilnius Žirmūnai Gymnasium is a Lithuanian language gymnasium school located in Žirmūnai district of Vilnius, Lithuania.

It used to be known as Vilnius Secondary School No. 7. The Gymnasium had 800 students in 2006. The school was granted the title Gymnasium in 2000; it is home to the brass band Septima, established in 1966.

External links
 Vilnius Žirmūnai Gymnasium

Educational institutions established in 1905
Secondary schools in Lithuania
Zirm
1905 establishments in the Russian Empire